In Bucharest – the capital city of Romania – the problem of stray dogs (maidanezi in Romanian) has been acknowledged for decades. The number of stray dogs has been reduced drastically since 2014, following the death of a four-year-old child who was attacked by a dog. In 2015, the Bucharest City Hall stated that over 51,200 stray dogs were captured between October 2013 and January 2015, with more than half being euthanized, about 23,000 being adopted, and  2,000 still residing in the municipality's shelters.
The issue has not only been a heated subject of debate in Bucharest, but also on a nationwide scale.

Background 

The problem has arisen as a result of systematization, a policy imposed during the Communist regime that ruled Romania for decades. Systematization forced people to move into apartment blocks and abandon their dogs.

The problem escalated in 2004, when the legislative framework that allowed the euthanasia of unclaimed stray dogs was repealed.

On 10 September 2013, the Parliament of Romania approved the Stray Dogs Euthanasia Law with an absolute majority.

On 24 September 2013, the Constitutional Court of Romania deemed the law to be in compliance with the Constitution of Romania.

On 25 September 2013, the President of Romania Traian Băsescu signed the Stray Dogs Euthanasia Law.

Prior to 25 September 2013 (source ? Legislation in 2001 authorizes euthanasia) (see below), the legislative framework of Romania did not allow the euthanasia of unclaimed stray dogs. The standard procedure stated that stray dogs were to be captured by an animal control officer. The dogs would then be taken to animal shelters operated independently by animal rights NGOs. At the shelter, the dogs were due to be sterilized and – if no one legally adopted them – they would be sent back on the streets or sent abroad for adoption.

Incidents 

Until the mid-2010s, dog bites occurred on a regular basis as a result of the stray dog situation. In 2012 alone, 16,192 people were bitten by dogs in Bucharest. Out of these, 3,300 were children.

At least three deaths have occurred in Bucharest as a result of dog packs biting citizens. Those who died were either elderly or children.

The issue of stray dogs gained international attention in 2006, when a Japanese citizen was bitten by dogs on Victory Square. The man died as a result of hemorrhagic shock caused by one of the many dog bites that severed an artery. The dog that was determined to have bitten the man was adopted by a German family and died of old age in April 2013.

In January 2011, a Romanian woman was lethally bitten by a dog. She died as a result of hemorrhagic shock, also caused by a dog bite that severed an artery.

Death of Ionuț Anghel 
The situation escalated rapidly on 2 September 2013, when a four-year-old boy was attacked by a stray dog in the proximity of a park in Bucharest. The event caused an instant outcry in the Romanian society. His death led to a series of changes in the legislative framework that allowed the euthanasia of stray dogs in an easier manner.

The child was playing together with his six-year-old brother, away from adult supervision. The two children were playing near private property, when a pack of dogs suddenly attacked the young boy. Since there were no adults around, his six-year-old brother ran away to get help from his grandmother (the woman was looking after them). By the time the grandmother arrived at the scene together with the police, the boy was found dead and disfigured in a bush.

Two days later, it was revealed that the dog that bit the child was registered to an animal rights NGO.

The reactions to his death were almost unanimously that of shock. The accident was listed as breaking news on news channels in Romania for multiple days. Protests were organized – both in favor of and against – the stray dogs euthanasia laws. After the mauling incident, gruesome retaliatory acts against stray dogs were reported — including disfigurement and burning puppies to death.

The then President of Romania Traian Băsescu urged the legislature to establish a set of laws urgently. The Prime Minister of Romania stated that he would support the Stray Dogs Euthanasia Law. As a result of the death, an investigation was started; those found guilty by a court of law will be sanctioned according to penal law.

Involvement 
The issue of stray dogs in Bucharest has multiple parties, each bearing an interest in the issue.

Asociația Cuțu Cuțu 
Asociația Cuțu Cuțu (literally translated Doggie Doggie Association in English) is a Romanian NGO that focuses on animal rights, and more specifically, stray dogs. It was founded in 2002 and has been lobbying against euthanasia, and other laws concerning stray dogs. It has been created as a response to the abuse stray dogs are facing.

In September 2013, an incident concerning a stray dog bite that led to the death of a four-year-old boy brought ACC back under national and international media attention.

Controversy
On May 4, 2012, Cuțu Cuțu issued a press release, which was flagged as "shocking", "terrible" and has been associated with Reductio ad Hitlerum by the Romanian mass-media and bloggers. The press release compared dog shelters with the Nazi concentration camps. Two days after the press release, the association has released another press statement, which mentioned the fact that they are not antisemitic and have "plenty of Romanian Jewish friends". Furthermore, it has been mentioned that what they wanted to point out is that the authorities treat dogs the way Jews were treated in 1940.

The National Council for Combating Discrimination (CNCD) has self-mandated and is going to start an inquiry.

Later in May 2012, the head of the Municipality of Bucharest, Sorin Oprescu, repealed the accusations. He said that his aim is to sterilize the stray dogs and take them off the streets.  The media responded positively towards his statement.

Vier Pfoten 
Vier Pfoten (Four paws in English) – an international animal welfare organisation – has been actively involved in lobbying for improvements in animal welfare in Romania for many years and runs CNR (capture, neuter, release) projects to manage the stray animal population in a humane and effective way working with municipalities across Romania, as well as supporting Speranta shelter (a shelter for 500 rescued stray dogs) close to Bucharest.

BBFWPA 

The first letter was sent in the Stray Dogs Euthanasia Law. She deemed the project to be a "project of systematic extermination". Furthermore, Bardot appealed to the "majority" in order to find a "solution approved by the European Union, from which Romania has been part of since 2007". The content of the letter has been received with criticism and skepticism in Romania. The President of Romania responded by saying that "Brigitte Bardot was beautiful during the reign of the Kings of France".

The second later was addressed to the "president of the unfortunate Romanian nation". Bardot stated that the President of Romania is "the successor of Nicolae Ceaușescu". In the letter, she asked "where the money from the European Commission was" and "where the 3.42 million vaccinated dogs were". Bardot said that "the dogs are paying with their life as a result of a corrupt management". She ended the letter by saying that she had "pleasant memories about Romania", but that she is "currently comparing it to hell".

See also 

 Stray dog attacks in India

Bibliography 

Bucharest
Culture in Bucharest